Yuga Purusha is an Indian 1989 Kannada-language film directed by D. Rajendra Babu. The film stars Ravichandran and Khushbu. It is a remake of Bollywood movie Karz. The music for the film was composed by Hamsalekha. The movie is about reincarnation, where a man is murdered by his newly wedded wife in his past life for the sake of acquiring the man's property. After taking a new birth, the man takes revenge against his past life's wife. Like other Ravichandran movies released during the late 80s period, this was also the musical blockbuster of the year.

Cast
 Ravichandran as Raaja 
 Khushbu as Chithra 
 Moon Moon Sen as Rani Kaamini Devi 
 Ramakrishna as Ravivarma 
 Leelavathi as Shanthadevi 
 Vajramuni as Anthony D'costa, Chithra's uncle 
 Lokanath as Mr. Oberoy 
 M. S. Umesh
 B. K. Shankar 
 Mandeep Roy as Dr. Dayal
 Mukhyamantri Chandru as Sir Judah
 Neegro Johnny 
 Lakshman Rao
 Rajanand
 Ananth Rao Maccheri 
 Jyothi Gurucharan

Soundtrack

The song Yaavudo Ee Bombe  was used by Hamsalekha in the 1989 Telugu movie Muthyamantha Muddu as Ichcohuko. The same song also used the tune of the line Neenenayya Maayagaaranu from the song Sri Krishna Bandanu  in between.

References

External links
 

1989 films
1980s Kannada-language films
Films about reincarnation
Indian films about revenge
Kannada remakes of Hindi films
Films scored by Hamsalekha
Films directed by D. Rajendra Babu